Vivo X60 is a line of Android-based smartphones developed and manufactured by Vivo, it featured the Zeiss co-engineered imaging system.

Notes

References

External links

Android (operating system) devices
Mobile phones introduced in 2021
Mobile phones with multiple rear cameras
Vivo smartphones
Mobile phones with 4K video recording
Mobile phones with 8K video recording